Pharyngodictyon is a genus of tunicates belonging to the family Ritterellidae.

The species of this genus are found in southern parts of Southern Hemisphere.

Species:

Pharyngodictyon bisinus 
Pharyngodictyon cauliformis 
Pharyngodictyon elongatum 
Pharyngodictyon magnifili 
Pharyngodictyon mirabile 
Pharyngodictyon reductum

References

Tunicates